In the Pit of the Stomach is the second studio album by Scottish indie rock band We Were Promised Jetpacks, released on 4 October 2011 on Fat Cat Records.

Track listing
All songs written by We Were Promised Jetpacks.

"Circles and Squares" - 5:19
"Medicine" - 3:46
"Through the Dirt and the Gravel" - 4:06
"Act on Impulse" - 5:31
"Hard to Remember" - 4:35
"Picture of Health" - 4:22
"Sore Thumb" - 5:17
"Boy In the Backseat" - 5:21
"Human Error" - 3:02
"Pear Tree" - 6:35
"Where I Belong" - 4:02 (Amazon bonus track)
"Build Me a Bridge" - 4:46 (iTunes bonus track)

Personnel
We Were Promised Jetpacks
Adam John Thompson – vocals, guitar
Michael Palmer – lead guitar
Sean Charles Smith – bass
Darren Kenneth Lackie – drums

Additional musicians
Andrew Bush - additional instrumentation
Mike Truscott - additional instrumentation
Solrun Sumarlioadottir - additional instrumentation

Technical personnel
Andrew Bush – producer, recording, engineer
We Were Promised Jetpacks - producer
Peter Katis – additional production, mixing
Paul Gold – mastering
Alan Douches – mastering

Artwork
dlt - artwork

References

2011 albums
We Were Promised Jetpacks albums
FatCat Records albums
Albums produced by Peter Katis